Events from the year 1917 in Japan. It corresponds to Taishō 6 (大正6年) in the Japanese calendar.

Incumbents
Emperor: Taishō
Prime Minister: Terauchi Masatake

Governors
Aichi Prefecture: Matsui Shigeru
Akita Prefecture: Genzaburo Kojima (until 29 January); Hijoki Kawaguchi (starting 29 January)
Aomori Prefecture: Matsujiro Obama (until 17 January); Takeji Kawamura (starting 17 January)
Ehime Prefecture: Sakata Kanta (until 29 January); Raizo Wakabayashi (starting 29 January)
Fukui Prefecture: Sato Kozaburo (until 29 January); Kawashima Miki (starting 29 January)
Fukushima Prefecture: Takukichi Kawasaki
Gifu Prefecture: Shimada Gotaro (until 17 January); Kanokogi Kogoro (starting 17 January)
Gunma Prefecture: Miyake Gennosuke (until 26 September); Tomojiro Nakagawa (starting 26 September)
Hiroshima Prefecture: Eitaro Mabuchi
Hyogo Prefecture: Seino Chotarno
Ibaraki Prefecture: Keisuke Sakanaka (until 17 January); Yuichiro Chikaraishi (starting 17 January)
Iwate Prefecture: Rinpei Otsu
Kagawa Prefecture: Raizo Wakabayashi (until 29 January); Sakata Kanta (starting 29 January)
Kochi Prefecture: Takeo Kakinuma
Kumamoto Prefecture: Ōta Masahiro
Kyoto Prefecture: Jūshirō Kiuchi
Mie Prefecture: Miki Nagano
Miyagi Prefecture: Tsunenosuke Hamada
Miyazaki Prefecture: Shutaro Horiuchi
Nagano Prefecture: Tenta Akaboshi
Niigata Prefecture: Tsuizui Katagawa (until 17 December); Watanabe Katsusaburo (starting 17 December)
Okinawa Prefecture: Kuniyoshi Suzuki
Osaka Prefecture: Marques Okubo Toshi Takeshi (until month unknown)
Saga Prefecture: 
 until 17 January: Ishibashi Kazu
 17 January-17 December: Okada
 starting 17 December: Muneyoshi Oshiba
Saitama Prefecture: Tadahiko Okada
Shiname Prefecture: Ichiro Oriharami (until 29 January); Yasukichi Nishimura (starting 29 January)
Tochigi Prefecture: Hiroyoshi Hiratsuka
Tokyo: Yuichi Ionue
Toyama Prefecture: Ki Masesaku (until 29 January); Takashi Inoue (starting 29 January)
Yamagata Prefecture: Soeda Keiichiro (until 17 December); Ichiro Yoda (starting 17 December)

Events
Japan during World War I
April 20 – 1917 Japanese general election
May 8–12 – 1917 Far Eastern Games held in Tokyo.
October 1 – According to Japanese government official document figure, a large-scale typhoon and tidal wave hit around Tokyo Bay area, 1,362 persons were human fatalities. 
November 2 – Lansing–Ishii Agreement

Births
January 1 – Shuntaro Hida, physician (d. 2017)
February 5 – Isuzu Yamada, actress (d. 2012)
March 5 – Mutsuo Toi, spree killer (d. 1938)
May 6 –  Prince Morihiro Higashikuni, husband of Princess Teru (d. 1969)
May 10 – Shigeo Sugiura,  freestyle swimmer (d. 1988)
August 15 – Yukio Tsuda, football player (d. 1979)
August 25 – Tosio Kato, mathematician (d. 1999)
September 7 – Tetsuo Hamuro, breaststroke swimmer (d. 2005)
September 11 – Yukiko Todoroki, actress (d. 1967)
October 19 – Kusuo Kitamura, Olympic swimmer (d. 1996)
November 25 – Noboru Terada, free style swimmer (d. 1986)

Deaths
July 19 – Kyōsuke Eto, army officer (b. 1881)
August 19 – Kikuchi Dairoku, mathematician and educator, (b. 1855)
August 21 – Yoshito Okuda, Mayor of Tokyo (b. 1860)
October 24 – Katayama Tōkuma, architect (b. 1854)
December 23 – Aoyama Tanemichi, medical scientist and doctor (b. 1859)

See also
List of Japanese films of the 1910s
Asian and Pacific theatre of World War I

References 

 
1910s in Japan
Years of the 20th century in Japan